Julian Lenz and Gerald Melzer were the defending champions but chose not to defend their title.

Sergio Galdós and Gonçalo Oliveira won the title after defeating Marcelo Tomás Barrios Vera and Alejandro Tabilo 6–2, 2–6, [10–5] in the final.

Seeds

Draw

References

External links
 Main draw

Lima Challenger II - Doubles
2021 Doubles